William Driver may refer to:
William Driver (1803–1886), American ship captain who coined the phrase "Old Glory" for the U.S. flag
 William J. Driver (1873–1948), American politician from Arkansas
 William L. Driver (1883–1941), American football coach for Washburn University, Mississippi, TCU and UC Davis
 William J. Driver (administrator) (1918–1985), American administrator for Veterans Affairs and commissioner for Social Security